Love Rain is a South Korean television series also known as Sarang bi.

Love Rain may also refer to:

"Love Rain" (Jill Scott song), 2000
"Love Rain" (Toshinobu Kubota song) "Koi no Ame", a 2010 Japanese song